Mona Goya (25 November 1909 – 8 October 1961) was a Mexican-born French film actress who rose to fame in the 1930s.

Selected filmography

 Madame Récamier (1928)
 Princesse Mandane (1928) - Simoun
 L'Argent (1928)
 Jim Hackett Champion (1928)
 Rayon de soleil (1929)
 The Lady from the Sea (1929) - Claire le Grange
 Hai-Tang (1930) - (French Version)
 The Flame of Love (1930) - Yvette
 Not So Quiet on the Western Front (1930) - Fifi
 The Price of Things (1930) - Natasha Boleska
 Chérie (1930) - Olivia Dangerfield
 Soyons gais (1930) - Diane
 Road to Dishonour (1930)
 Révolte dans la prison (1931) - Anna Harvey
 Jenny Lind (1931) - Selma
 Hardi les gars (1931) - Yvette
 La bande à Bouboule (1931) - Émilienne
 Buster se marie (1931)
 Amour et discipline (1931) - Juliette Giroudet
 Quand on est belle (1932) - Peg
 Coiffeur pour dames (1932) - Aline
 The Wonderful Day (1932) - La jeune femme
 Buridan's Donkey (1932) - Micheline
 The Bread Peddler (1934) - Mary
 Nemo's Bank (1934) - Charlotte
 Mam'zelle Spahi (1934) - Une femme au bal (uncredited)
 Un tour de cochon (1934)
 Trois cents à l'heure (1934) - La comtesse de Portebault
 Les époux célibataires (1935) - Fleurette Legrand
 Jonny, haute-couture (1935) - Liliane
 Light Cavalry (1935) - Rosika
 Juggernaut (1936) - Yvonne Clifford
 Josette (1937) - La chanteuse Viviane Eros
 Francis the First (1937) - Elsa / Madeleine Ferron
 Clothes and the Woman (1937) - Cecilie
 The Messenger (1937) - Pierrette
 Les femmes collantes (1938) - Rose
 Ernest the Rebel (1938) - Suzanne
 I Was an Adventuress (1938) - Une jeune femme
 Feux de joie (1939) - Lola
 Vous seule que j'aime (1939) - Cecil Jackett, Américaine
 This Man in Paris (1939) - Torch Bernal
 Whirlwind of Paris (1939) - Marie-Claude
 Annette and the Blonde Woman (1942) - Myriam Morisson
 Défense d'aimer (1942) - Lucette de Saint-Églefin
 Captain Fracasse (1943) - La marquise des Bruyères / La marchesa di Bruyeres
 L'homme qui vendit son âme (1943) - Colette
 Mon amour est près de toi (1943) - Odette
 Donne-moi tes yeux (1943) - Gilda
 La Malibran (1944) - Madame Garcia
 Vingt-quatre heures de perm (1945) - Huguette Landier
 L'extravagante mission (1945) - Théodora Bareski
 Not So Stupid (1946) - Gaby Moreuil
 Mandrin (1947) - Madame de Pompadour
 Blanc comme neige (1948) - Suzy Rexy
 Impeccable Henri (1948) - Elvire
 My Aunt from Honfleur (1949)
 Forbidden to the Public (1949) - Nicole Guise
 Une nuit de noces (1950) - Valentine
 Les maîtres-nageurs (1951)
 Les amants de Bras-Mort (1951) - La veuve Girard
 Gibier de potence (1951) - Henriette
 Jamais deux sans trois (1951) - Rita Malaquais
 His Father's Portrait (1953) - La mère de Domino / Mother
 Meeting in Paris (1956) - Mme. Payette
 La Famille Anodin (1956-1957, TV Series) - Tante Léa
 Springtime in Paris (1957)
 Le désert de Pigalle (1958) - Delmine
 Miss Pigalle (1958)
 Les amants de demain (1959) - La cliente de la pension Les Géraniums
 Babette Goes to War (1959) - Mme Fernande
 The Old Guard (1960) - Catherine

References

External links
 

1909 births
1961 deaths
20th-century French actresses
Mexican film actresses
Mexican silent film actresses
French film actresses
French silent film actresses
Actresses from Mexico City
Naturalized citizens of France
Mexican emigrants to France